Doto millbayana is a species of sea slug, a nudibranch, a marine gastropod mollusc in the family Dotidae.

Distribution
This species was first described from Plymouth, United Kingdom. It has subsequently been reported widely in Britain and Ireland, and south to Galicia, Spain.

Description
This nudibranch is translucent white with dark red spots on the ceratal tubercles. Extra spots occur on the surfaces of the cerata between the tubercles. The back and sides are spattered with red pigment which extends up the inner faces of the rhinophore sheaths.

EcologyDoto millbayana feeds on the hydroid Plumularia setacea'', family Plumulariidae.

References

Dotidae
Gastropods described in 1976